Pine Ridge is an unincorporated community in Delta County, in the U.S. state of Michigan.

History
Pine Ridge was named from the fact there was a forest of pines at a lofty elevation near the original town site.

References

Unincorporated communities in Delta County, Michigan